Peregrine Cust may refer to:

Peregrine Cust (1723–1785), Member of Parliament for Bishop's Castle (1761–1768), New Shoreham (1768–1774), Ilchester (1774–1775) and (1780–1785), and Grantham (1776–1780)
Peregrine Cust (1791–1873), Member of Parliament for Honiton (1818–1826) and Clitheroe (1826–1832)
Peregrine Cust, 6th Baron Brownlow (1899–1978), soldier and politician